For administrative purposes, the city of Bangalore was divided into nine zones, which are further subdivided into a total of 198 wards administered by the Bruhat Bengaluru Mahanagara Palike (BBMP).

See also
 List of wards in Bangalore
 Yelahanka Ward
 2010 Greater Bengaluru Municipal Corporation election
 2015 Greater Bengaluru Municipal Corporation election

References

External links
 BBMP ward information
 BBMP wards list
BBMP Wards Mapview OpenCity

Bangalore-related lists
Municipal wards of Bangalore